In hyperbolic geometry, Thurston's double limit theorem gives condition for a sequence of quasi-Fuchsian groups to have a convergent subsequence.

Statement
By Bers's theorem, quasi-Fuchsian groups (of some fixed genus) are parameterized by points in T×T, where T is Teichmüller space of the same genus.  Suppose that there is a sequence of quasi-Fuchsian groups corresponding to points (gi, hi) in T×T.  Also suppose that  the sequences gi, hi converge to points μ,μ′ in the Thurston boundary of Teichmüller space of projective measured laminations. If the points μ,μ′ have the property that any nonzero measured lamination has positive intersection number with at least one of them, then the sequence of quasi-Fuchsian groups has a subsequence that converges algebraically.

References

 Translated into English as 

Kleinian groups
Hyperbolic geometry
Theorems in geometry